Arteta is a Basque surname that may refer to:

Ainhoa Arteta (born 1964), Spanish soprano singer
Aurelio Arteta (1879–1940), Spanish painter
Inés Arteta, Argentine writer
Miguel Arteta (born 1965), American director of film and television
Mikel Arteta (born 1982), Spanish football coach and former player
Pedro José de Arteta (1797–1873), former Vice President of Ecuador
Diego Noboa y Arteta (1789–1870), also known as Diego Noboa, former President of Ecuador

References

Basque-language surnames